Re Ru is a 1999 Sri Lankan Sinhala comedy drama film directed and produced by Jayasekara Aponso. It stars Jayasekara Aponso and Dilhani Ekanayake in lead roles along with Avanthi Aponso and Bandula Vithanage. Music composed by D.D Gunasena. It is the 909th Sri Lankan film in the Sinhala cinema.

Plot

Cast
 Jayasekara Aponso 
 Dilhani Ekanayake as Kumari
 Avanthi Aponso		
 Gamini Aponso		
 Dammika Aponso
 Bandula Vithanage		
 Thilak Kumara Rathnayake

Soundtrack
This is last movie of Milton Mallawarachchi voice....

References

1999 films
1990s Sinhala-language films